Dr. Agop Handanyan (born 1834, Diyarbakir, Ottoman Empire - died October 30, 1899 Istanbul, Ottoman Empire) was a respected physician, writer, translator, professor, and author of the first forensic science book in Ottoman Turkey. He was of Armenian descent.

Background
Agop Handanyan was born in Diyarbakir and moved to Istanbul at the age of five. He first studied at the local Armenian  in Scutari, the Asiatic part of Constantinople. After graduating from the Lyceum, he pursued a medical career. He later worked for the general archives of the Assembly of Civil Medical School.

Translations
Having known French very well, Agop Handanyan completed the important task of translating works of French medical books into Ottoman Turkish. He first translated books of Joseph Briand and Ernest Chaudé from the French into English in 1875.  His then wrote the Tıbb-ı Kanunî in 1877, which was a translation from the French. This was followed by a toxicology study called Kimya-yi Kanunî in 1885. These books are considered the first medical books in Turkish history.

References 

1834 births
People from Diyarbakır
1899 deaths
19th-century physicians from the Ottoman Empire
Armenian physicians
Armenians from the Ottoman Empire
Armenian translators
19th-century translators
French–Turkish translators
19th-century writers from the Ottoman Empire
Non-fiction writers from the Ottoman Empire
Armenian medical writers